This page provides the party lists put forward in New Zealand's 2005 election. Party lists determine (in the light of proportional voting) the appointment of list MPs under the mixed-member proportional (MMP) electoral system. Electoral law required submission of all party lists by 23 August 2005.

Parliamentary parties
The following parties gained representation:

ACT New Zealand

Initially, ACT's list also included Andy Poulsen at 9th place and Roger Greenslade at 21st, but both candidates subsequently withdrew.

Green Party

Labour Party

Eight sitting Labour MPs chose not to take list positions, namely: Tim Barnett, Clayton Cosgrove, Harry Duynhoven, George Hawkins, Nanaia Mahuta, Damien O'Connor, Ross Robertson, and John Tamihere. Rumour stated that the Labour Party initially gave George Hawkins a list placing, but that he withdrew after receiving a lower ranking than he had wanted.

Six candidates contested electorates without appearing on the list, namely: Sally Barrett, Julian Blanchard, Paul Chalmers, Tony Dunlop, Errol Mason, and Pauline Scott.

In addition, the Labour Party removed one candidate (Steven Ching) from the list after its first announcement. Ching originally had the ranking of number 42.

Māori Party

National Party

New Zealand First

Jim Anderton's Progressive

United Future New Zealand

For the 2005 election, United Future affiliated with Outdoor Recreation NZ and the WIN Party. Both parties stood their member or members as United Future members instead of standing under their own party banner.

Initially, Paul Adams and his daughter Sharee Adams appeared on the list, ranked 10th and 17th, respectively. Adams later decided to stand as an independent, however, and his daughter also withdrew.

Unsuccessful registered parties
The following registered parties did not gain representation:

99 MP Party

Alliance

Aotearoa Legalise Cannabis Party

Christian Heritage NZ

Democrats For Social Credit

For the 2002 election, the Democrats for Social Credit had been part of Jim Anderton's Progressive Coalition, but split shortly after that election.

Destiny New Zealand

Direct Democracy Party

Libertarianz

The Libertarianz party did not contest the 2002 general election. The 'previous rank' and 'change' columns above compare against the 1999 list.

New Zealand Family Rights Protection Party

Susi Pa'o Williams was on the party list for Jim Anderton's Progressive Coalition in 2002, where they were ranked ninth.

OneNZ

Outdoor Recreation
In the 2005 elections, Outdoor Recreation NZ stood in  affiliation with United Future, and all Outdoor Recreation candidates stood under the United Future banner. Outdoor Recreation therefore had no list of its own. However, the United Future section of this page identifies those candidates attached to Outdoor Recreation.

The Republic of New Zealand Party

References

External links
 Compare party lists

2005 New Zealand general election
Lists of New Zealand political candidates
Party lists